Niels Vandeputte (born 19 September 2000) is a Belgian cyclist, who currently rides for UCI Continental team . He won the prestigious Under-23 Duinencross Koksijde in 2019.

Major results

2016–2017
 1st Junior Rucphen
 Junior DVV Trophy
2nd Essen
2nd Loenhout
3rd Hamme
 Junior Soudal Classics
2nd Neerpelt
2nd Mol
 Junior Superprestige
3rd Ruddervoorde
2017–2018
 1st  National Junior XCO MTB Championships
 UCI Junior World Cup
1st Hoogerheide
3rd Heusden-Zolder
 Junior Superprestige
1st Middelkerke
2nd Hoogstraten
3rd Ruddervoorde
 Junior DVV Trophy
1st Lille
 1st Junior Oostmalle
 1st Junior Brabant
 Junior Soudal Classics
2nd Mol
 Junior Brico Cross
3rd Hulst
 3rd National Junior Championships
2018–2019
 Under-23 DVV Trophy
1st Antwerpen
2nd Lille
 1st Under-23 Gullegem
 Under-23 Brico Cross
2nd Hulst
 2nd Under-23 Oostmalle
 3rd National Under-23 Championships
2019–2020
 UCI Under-23 World Cup
1st Koksijde
3rd Hoogerheide
 3rd Overall Under-23 DVV Trophy
1st Hamme
1st Kortrijk
1st Lille
 2nd National Under-23 Championships
2020–2021
 X²O Badkamers Trophy
3rd Brussels
2021–2022
 2nd  UEC European Under-23 Championships
 X²O Badkamers Trophy
2nd Lille
 UCI Under-23 World Cup
2nd Namur
2022–2023
 1st Bensheim
 UCI World Cup
2nd Val di Sole
 2nd Lützelbach
 3rd Oostmalle

References

External links

Niels Vandeputte at Cyclocross 24

2000 births
Living people
Belgian male cyclists
Place of birth missing (living people)
Cyclo-cross cyclists
People from Brecht, Belgium
Cyclists from Antwerp Province